Kansas Gas Service is the largest natural gas distribution company in the U.S. state of Kansas, operating in 82 counties. It is a regulated public utility which serves 634,000 customers in 360 communities, employing 1,000 employees. In addition to owning seven interstate pipeline connections and three intrastate pipeline connections, Kansas Gas Service operates 13,500 miles of service lines, pipelines and other natural gas properties. Headquartered in Overland Park, Kansas, the company was a division of ONEOK Inc., a Tulsa-based Fortune 200 company since 1997 until ONEOK spun off Kansas Gas Service and its two other distribution companies—Oklahoma Natural Gas Company and Texas Gas Service—to form ONE Gas in 2014.

History
Kansas Gas Service was formed in 1997 when ONEOK purchased the natural gas assets of Western Resources (now Evergy). However, it traces its history to the former natural gas subsidiaries of Kansas Gas & Electric and Kansas Power & Light, the two companies that merged to form Western Resources in 1992. At one time, it also served portions of Missouri and Oklahoma. Parts of Kansas Gas Service were joined with the former Missouri Gas Service together being The Gas Service Company until being purchased by Kansas Power and Light in the late 1980s.

References

External links
 

Natural gas companies of the United States
Companies based in Kansas
Oneok